Charles Loomis may refer to:

 Charles Battell Loomis (1861–1911), American author
 Charles Clark Loomis (1921–2011), mathematical physicist